FMC, the Association of Former Members of Congress is a non-partisan, non-profit organization of over 800 Former Members of the United States Congress.

History

The United States Association of Former Members of Congress was founded in 1970 as an alumni organization, eventually becoming chartered by The United States Congress in 1983 under Chapter 703 of Title 36 of the United States Code.

Objectives and activities

The objectives of the United States Association of Former Members of Congress, which it seeks to achieve through its various programming, are (i) promoting and educating about public service and The United States Congress, (ii) strengthening representative democracy and (iii) keeping members connected after service.

Of the Association's various programming, the Congress to Campus program has been executed for over 40 years, through a partnership with the Stennis Center for Public Service Leadership.

The Congressional Study Groups
FMC is home to The Congressional Study Groups. The Congressional Study Groups are independent, non-partisan international legislative exchanges committed to increasing bilateral and multilateral dialogue with the United States’ strategic allies." There are currently Congressional Study Groups on Germany (formed in 1983), Japan (formed in 1993), Europe (formed in 2012) and Korea (formed in 2018). The four Study Groups bring together current members of the U.S. Congress, and their staff, with government officials, members of civil society, students and other stakeholders to collaborate on transatlantic and transpacific issues between the United States and its trade partners and allies. Leadership of The Congressional Study Groups, such as Tom Petri and Connie Morella have received awards from foreign governments for their work in supporting bilateral relations.

Leadership

Executive Committee:

President: L.F. Payne (D-VA)
President-Elect: Barbara Comstock (R-VA)
Vice President: Donna Edwards (D-MD)
Vice President: Dennis Ross (R-FL)
Past President: Charles Boustany (R-LA)

Board of Directors:

Jim Gerlach (R-PA), Tom Graves (R-GA), Tim Hutchinson (R-AR), Carol Moseley Braun (D-IL), Bart Gordon (D-TN), Charles W. Dent (R-PA), Doug Jones (D-AL), Loretta Sanchez (D-CA), Albert Wynn (D-MD), Robert Goodlatte (R-VA), Peter Roskam (R-IL), Elizabeth Esty (D-CT), Byron Dorgan (D-ND), Jeff Miller  (R-FL), Randy Neugebauer (R-TX), Jim Moran (D-VA), Barbara Kennelly (D-CT), Jim Slattery (D-KS), Dennis Hertel (D-MI), Larry LaRocco (D-ID), Matt McHugh (D-NY), Connie Morella (R-MD), Cliff Stearns (R-FL), Martin Frost (D-TX), Tim Petri (R-WI), Bob Clement (D-TN), Dan Glickman (D-KS), Bob Carr (D-MI), James R. Jones (D-OK), Jim Kolbe (R-AZ), Olympia Snowe (R-ME), Ken Kramer (R-CO), Martin Lancaster (D-NC).

Co-Chairs of The Congressional Study Groups:

The Congressional Study Group on Germany: Sen. Jeanne Shaheen (D-NH), Sen. Tim Scott (R-SC), Rep. Ted Deutch (D-FL)
The Congressional Study Group on Japan: Sen. Mazie K. Hirono (D-HI), Sen. Lisa Murkowski (R-AK),  Rep. Larry Buchson (R-IN), Rep. Diana DeGette (D-CO)
The Congressional Study Group on Europe: Sen. John Boozman (R-AK), Sen. Chris Murphy (D-CT), Rep. Bill Huizenga (R-MI), Rep. Peter Welch (D-VT)
The Congressional Study Group on Korea: Sen. Brian Schatz (D-HI), Sen. Dan Sullivan (R-AK), Rep. Ami Bera (D-CA), Rep. Young Kim (R-CA)

References

Nonpartisan organizations in the United States
Organizations established in 1970
Patriotic and national organizations chartered by the United States Congress